USS Heron (MSC(O)-18/AMS-18/YMS-369) was a  built for the United States Navy during World War II.

Heron was laid down as YMS-369 on 13 January 1943 by Wheeler Shipbuilding Corp., Whitestone, New York, and launched 24 July 1943. The sponsor was Miss Frances J. McCarthy, an employee of the firm. The YMS was commissioned 11 October 1943.

The minesweeper's World War II service in the American Theatre of operations consisted of minesweeping and escort duty in the Gulf of Mexico and Caribbean while based in Key West; in the Gulf of Maine while based in Portland; and sweeping the approaches to New York City while based in Tompkinsville. Pacific operations included sweeping around the home islands after the Japanese surrender. On 2 March 1946, she sailed for home after 4 months in Japanese waters and was decommissioned. She was named USS Heron and reclassified AMS-18 7 February 1947.

After recommissioning 15 July 1949, Heron engaged in training exercises on the U.S. West Coast until 4 October 1950, when she sailed for Korean War duty. She patrolled off the Korean Peninsula and was of invaluable assistance for her clearing of channels for blockading ships in the siege of Wonsan Harbor in March 1951.

Heron received superficial damage after being hit by a shore battery at Wonsan, North Korea, no casualties, 10 September 1951.

She maintained surveillance of North Korean sea traffic after the Armistice until January 1954, when she retired to Sasebo, Japan, for training duties.

Reclassified MSC(O)-18 on 17 February 1955, Heron decommissioned again 21 March, and was turned over to the Japanese Maritime Self Defense Force the same day to serve as Nuwajima (MSC-657).

Heron was returned to U.S. Navy custody 31 March 1967, struck from the Naval Vessel Register the same day, and used as a fire target by the Japanese Maritime Staff Office.

Awards and honors 
Heron earned one battle star for World War II service, and eight battle stars for her participation in the Korean War.

References

External links 
 
 The Shore Batteries at Wonsan, an account by Burl Gilliland of serving on Heron, while under fire from North Korean shore batteries. (Includes photos.)
 Photo of U.S. Navy ships at Sasebo, Japan, that includes Heron in the distance. (see this page for description of photo.)

YMS-1-class minesweepers of the United States Navy
Ships built in Queens, New York
1943 ships
World War II minesweepers of the United States
Korean War minesweepers of the United States
YMS-1-class minesweepers of the Japan Maritime Self-Defense Force